In mathematics, Bernoulli's inequality (named after Jacob Bernoulli) is an inequality that approximates exponentiations of 1 + x. It is often employed in real analysis. It has several useful variants:
  for every integer r ≥ 1 and real number x > −1. The inequality is strict if x ≠ 0 and r ≥ 2.
  for every even integer r ≥ 0 and every real number x.
  for every integer r ≥ 0 and every real number x ≥ −2.
  for every real number r ≥ 1 and x ≥ −1. The inequalities are strict if x ≠ 0 and r ≠ 0, 1.
  for every real number 0 ≤ r ≤ 1 and x ≥ −1.

History
Jacob Bernoulli first published the inequality in his treatise "Positiones Arithmeticae de Seriebus Infinitis" (Basel, 1689), where he used the inequality often.

According to Joseph E. Hofmann, Über die Exercitatio Geometrica des M. A. Ricci (1963), p. 177, the inequality is actually due to Sluse in his Mesolabum (1668 edition), Chapter IV "De maximis & minimis".

Proof for integer exponent
Bernoulli's inequality can be proved for the case in which r is an integer, using mathematical induction in the following form:
 from validity for some r we deduce validity for r + 2.

For r = 0,

is equivalent to 1 ≥ 1 which is true.

Similarly, for r = 1 we have

Now suppose the statement is true for r = k:

Then it follows that 

By the modified induction we conclude the statement is true for every non-negative integer r.

Generalizations

Generalization of exponent 
The exponent r can be generalized to an arbitrary real number as follows: if x > −1, then

for r ≤ 0 or r ≥ 1, and

for 0 ≤ r ≤ 1.

This generalization can be proved by comparing derivatives. The strict versions of these inequalities require x ≠ 0 and r ≠ 0, 1.

Generalization of base 
Instead of  the inequality holds also in the form  where  are real numbers, all greater than -1, all with the same sign. Bernoulli's inequality is a special case when . This generalized inequality can be proved by mathematical induction.

In the first step we take . In this case the inequality  is obviously true.

In the second step we assume validity of the inequality for  numbers and deduce validity for  numbers.

We assume thatis valid. After multiplying both sides with a positive number  we get:

As  all have the same sign, the products  are all positive numbers. So the quantity on the right-hand side can be bounded as follows:what was to be shown.

Related inequalities 
The following inequality estimates the r-th power of 1 + x from the other side. For any real numbers x, r with r > 0, one has

where e = 2.718.... This may be proved using the inequality (1 + 1/k)k < e.

Alternative form

This can be proved (for any integer t) by using the formula for geometric series: (using y = 1 − x)

or equivalently

Alternative proofs

Let  be two non-negative real constants.

Note that 

and

so our inequality is equivalent to

After substituting  (bearing in mind that this implies ) our inequality turns into 

which is Bernoulli's inequality.

Bernoulli's inequality 

 

is equivalent to

and by the formula for geometric series (using y = 1 + x) we get
  
which leads to

If  then by the same arguments  and thus
all addends  are non-positive and hence so is their sum. Since the product of two non-positive numbers is non-negative, we get again
().

One can prove Bernoulli's inequality for x ≥ 0 using the binomial theorem. It is true trivially for r = 0, so suppose r is a positive integer. Then  Clearly  and hence  as required.

For  the function  is strictly convex. Therefore for  holds
 

Notes

References

External links 
 
 Bernoulli Inequality by Chris Boucher, Wolfram Demonstrations Project.
 

Inequalities